Jung Shin-hye is a South Korean actress. She is known for her roles in dramas such as Angry Mom, Love Playlist, Snowdrop, Confession Company and Cheer Up. She also appeared in movies Seondal: The Man Who Sells the River and Detour.

Filmography

Television series

Web series

Film

Music video appearances

References

External links 
 
 

1994 births
21st-century South Korean actresses
Living people
South Korean television actresses
South Korean film actresses
South Korean web series actresses